Belgium was heavily involved in the early development of railway transport. Belgium was the second country in Europe, after Great Britain, to open a railway and produce locomotives. The first line, between the cities of Brussels and Mechelen opened in 1835. Belgium was the first state in Europe to create a national railway network and the first to possess a nationalised railway system. The network expanded fast as Belgium industrialised, and by the early 20th century was increasingly under state-control. The nationalised railways, under the umbrella organisation National Railway Company of Belgium (NMBS/SNCB), retained their monopoly until liberalisation in the 2000s.

Background
Attempts to build railways in Belgium significantly predated the establishment of the first line. In 1829, the British-Belgian industrialist John Cockerill tried to obtain a concession from the Dutch king William I to build a railway line from Brussels to Antwerp, without success. Shortly after the independence of Belgium from the Netherlands after the Belgian Revolution of 1830, a debate opened on the desirability of establishing public railway lines using the steam locomotives recently developed in England, where the first private railway had been completed in 1825.

Post-independence
Following the Belgian Revolution of 1830, when Belgium split from the Netherlands, Belgium became a key site of railway development. In 1831, a proposal to build a railway between Antwerp and Cologne (in neighbouring Prussia) which would link the industrializing Ruhr and Meuse valleys with the ports of the Scheldt was considered by the Chamber of Representatives but was eventually rejected. In August 1831, however, the government launched a big scale survey (under the supervision of Pierre Simons and Gustave de Ridder) of potential sites for railways which, it was hoped, would help to regenerate the Belgian economy. Particularly in liberal circles, it was felt that railways would not serve a purely economic function, but were also necessary part of forging Belgian national identity.

Rail networks and railways

First railways

Unlike the United Kingdom, where early railways had been developed by the private sector, the state took the initiative in the development of railways in Belgium, partly out of the fear that large banks, like the Société Générale de Belgique could develop a monopoly in the industry. Considering that the railways would be a major economic resource and a full national network would be necessary, the Belgian government was unusual at the time for planning a national network in advance before any was built.

At first, only one line was studied (the line between Antwerp and the Prussian border). However, the project quickly evolved:

 Instead of a direct line, the Antwerp - Cologne line was rerouted through Mechelen (where a short stub line to Brussels could be built), Leuven, Liège and Verviers. This itinerary was longer and more complicated but it would be more profitable and generate more traffic ;
 Another line, starting at Mechelen, would reach Dendermonde, Ghent, Bruges and Ostend, granting a safe access to the sea (since the Dutch were able to blockade the Scheldt, cutting Antwerp away from the sea) ;.
 A southbound line would link Brussels and Mons, an industrial town at the heart of the Sillon industriel, before crossing the French border (near Quiévrain), where a connecting line could reach Valenciennes, in northern France.

In 1834, the Belgian government approved a plan to build a railway between Mons, and the port of Antwerp via Brussels at a cost of 150 million Belgian francs. The first stretch of the Belgian railway network, between northern Brussels and Mechelen, it was completed in 1835 and was the first steam passenger railway in continental Europe. The line between Liège and Ostend meant that the country had a full rail network planned nearly from the outset. By 1836, the line to Antwerp had been completed and by 1843 the two main lines (which formed a rough north-south/east-west cross) had been finished while two other mainlines (Ghent - Kortrijk - Mouscron - Tournai (with an international line linking Mouscron with Lille) - Braine-le-Comte (on the Brussels - Mons line) - Manage (near La Louvière) - Charleroi - Namur) were added to this network and completed by 1843. In 1843, each provincial capital (save Arlon and Hasselt) had a railway station.

Early Belgian railways were heavily influenced by British designs, and British technology and engineers were extremely important. The engineer George Stephenson travelled on the first train between Brussels-Mechelen in 1835, and his company provided the first three locomotives (based on the Rocket design) used on the line. The rapid expansion of the Belgian railways in the 1830s was one of the factors allowing Belgium to recover from an economic recession which it had experienced since the revolution and served as a major force in the Belgian Industrial Revolution.

Expansion

In France and Germany, private companies quickly built connections to the Belgian international lines, connecting the cities of Lille, Valenciennes (in France), Cologne and Aachen (in Germany) to the Belgian network between 1842 and 1843.

Despite the fact that very few lines (47,7 km) were built by the Belgian State Railways between 1845 and 1870, subsequent development of the rail network was largely organized by the state rather than by private companies. Several lines were built by private companies, notably the Namur to Liège line built in 1851, on a ninety-year lease which would return them to the government after the period has lapsed. Many of the mainlines were operated by the Belgian State Railways. Belgium's first telegraph line was installed in 1846 along the Brussels-Antwerp railway. Unlike canals, which made internal trade much easier than international, the railways also pushed Belgian companies to export their goods abroad. The success of the railways both intensified Belgian industrialisation and consolidated Antwerp's position as one of Europe's pre-eminent ports.

Ownership, nationalisation and electrification 

The Belgian government resisted attempts by foreign companies to buy up railway assets in Belgium. In the winter of 1868, against a background of French threats to Belgium and Luxembourg under the rule of Napoleon III, the French Compagnie des chemins de fer de l'Est attempted to buy up numerous railway lines situated in southern and eastern Belgium in the provinces of Liège, Limburg and Luxembourg. The Belgian state, under Leopold II, felt that the takeover presented a military and political threat and intervened to stop the sale in 1869. A British diplomatic intervention made Napoleon back off, thus ending this Belgian Railway Crisis.

In 1870, the Belgian state owned  of rail lines, while the private enterprises owned . From 1870 to 1882, the railways were gradually nationalised. Full nationalisation was considered at the time, but was not enacted until 1926 when the National Railway Company of Belgium (SNCB-NMBS) was started, replacing the earlier Chemins de fer de l'État belge. By 1958 the network was fully state-owned.

The SNCB-NMBS first introduced electrification on the  Brussels North to Antwerp Central line in May 1935. The system adopted was 3 kV DC

During the German occupation in World War II, the SNCB-NMBS was forced to participate in the deportation of Belgian Jews to camps in Eastern Europe as part of The Holocaust.

Liberalisation
In 2005, the NMBS/SNCB was split up into three parts, to facilitate future liberalisation of railway freight and passenger services in agreement with European regulations. Several freight operators have since received access permissions for the Belgian network.

Colonial and overseas railways
Numerous railways were built in the Belgian Congo under Belgian colonial rule which form the basis of the railway infrastructure of the Democratic Republic of the Congo.

Belgian engineers and railway companies were instrumental in building railways in Persia, China, the Ottoman Empire and elsewhere.

Locomotives

The first Belgian-built locomotive, named Le Belge, was built under licence by John Cockerill & Cie. (the foremost Belgian industrial manufacturing firm at the time) according to a design licensed by Robert Stephenson & Co. in 1835. Le Belge is considered the first locomotive produced in continental Europe. Led by firms such as Cockerill, Belgium became a major centre of locomotive design and manufacture before World War II. Other companies included the Société Anglo-Franco-Belge, La Meuse and the Ateliers de Tubize.

The SNCB-NMBS traditionally terms its locomotives as classes or types.

Tramways

Belgium has a long tradition of tramways as part of the public transport of its towns and cities. It once had the Vicinal tramway, a network of trams that covered the whole nation, and whose total length was longer than the mainline railway network. Most of these tramways were closed due to the advent of cars and buses. Today there are seven tram systems operating in the country. The network in Brussels is one of the largest in the world and the seacoast line is the world's longest tram line. Horse-drawn trams operated from 1869 and the first electric trams appeared in 1894.

Belgians also played a major part in exporting tram components abroad. Baron Empain, a Belgian industrialist and major investor in railways, gained the nickname "Tramway King" for his company's work in Russia, France, China, Egypt and the Congo and is perhaps best known for his work on the Paris Métro.

Museums and heritage railways
Train World, a railway museum in Schaerbeek, Brussels opened on 25 September 2015,
Museum of Patrimoine Ferroviaire et Tourisme at Saint-Ghislain in Hainaut province,
Trois Vallées steam railway, a heritage railway based in Treignes in the province of Namur.
Stoomtrein Maldegem - Eeklo
Stoomtrein Dendermonde - Puurs
Brussels Tram Museum, a collection of historic trams in Brussels.
ASVi museum, a tram museum in Thuin, Hainaut province.

See also

Beijing–Hankou Railway in China, built by Belgian capital
History of Belgium
Rail transport in Belgium
Vennbahn
History of rail transport in Luxembourg

References

Notes

Bibliography

Further reading

External links

 Michel Marin, Histoire des Chemins de Fer en Belgique  - an online history of rail transport in Belgium
 Guy Demeulder, Les gares belges d'autrefois - historic photographs of railways in Belgium

Belgium
Rail transport in Belgium
Economic history of Belgium
Rail